Federico Díaz may refer to:

 Federico Díaz (activist), Czech-Argentine visual activist
 Federico Díaz (footballer), Argentine goalkeeper